Rosdin Wasli (born 26 June 1982) is a Malaysian footballer who plays as a defender and midfielder for Sabah FA in Malaysia Premier League. He was born in Petagas, Kota Kinabalu, Sabah.

References

Malaysian footballers
People from Sabah
Living people
1982 births
Sabah F.C. (Malaysia) players
Association football defenders